Malangali Secondary School was one of the leading academic institutions in colonial Tanganyika. It retained its reputation for academic excellence after Tanganyika won independence from Britain in December 1961.

It produced a large number of people who went on to fill government positions, especially in the civil service, during the early years of independence when the country did not have many educated people. Secondary school graduates formed the backbone of the civil service in Tanganyika (later Tanzania) during the post-colonial era.

Among its alumni were some of the people who played a major role in the struggle for independence in Tanganyika and in the new nation after it emerged from colonial rule. They included John Mwakangale who was one of the main leaders in the struggle for independence in the fifties, and Jeremiah Kasambala who became one of the first cabinet members under Prime Minister – later President – Julius Nyerere in the early years of independence.1

See also
 Malangali, Mufindi

References

1. Godfrey Mwakikagile, Nyerere and Africa: End of an Era, New Africa Press, Fifth Edition, Pretoria, South Africa, 2010, pp. 94, 105, 112, 119, 329 – 330, 492; John Illife, A Modern History of Tanganyika, Cambridge University Press, Cambridge, UK, 1979, pp. 560, 565; Ronald Aminzade, Race, Nation, and Citizenship in Post-Colonial Africa: The Case of Tanzania, New York, Cambridge University Press, 2013, p. 116; Michael Longford, The Flags Changed at Midnight: Towards the Independence of Tanganyika, Gracwing, Leominster, Herefordshire, UK., 2001, p. 48; Godfrey Mwakikagile, Tanzania under Mwalimu Nyerere: Reflections on an African Statesman, New Africa Press, Pretoria, South Africa, 2006, p. 17; Godfrey Mwakikagile, Life in Tanganyika in The Fifties, Third Edition, New Africa Press, Dar es Salaam, Tanzania, 2010, p. 149; M. W. Kanyama Chiume, Kwacha: An Autobiography, East African Publishing House, Nairobi, Kenya, 1975, p. 92; M.W.K. Chiume, Autobiography of Kanyama Chiume, Panaf, London, 1982, p. 100; Jeni Klugman, Bilini Neyapti, and Frances Stewart, Conflict and Growth in Africa, Vol. 2: Kenya, Tanzania and Uganda, Development Centre Studies, OECD, Paris, France, 1999, p. 79; Francis Fanuel Lyimo, Rural Cooperation in the Cooperative in Tanzania, Mkuki na Nyota Publishers, Dar es Salaam, Tanzania, 2012, p. 37; Tanganyika News Review, Volumes 1 – 15, Tanganyika Information Services, Dar es Salaam, Tanganyika, 1961, p. 14;  Africa Report, 1965, p. 30; EAPH Political Studies, Volume 3, East African Publishing House, Nairobi, Kenya, 1967, pp. 128, 227.

2. Godfrey Mwakikagile: Eurocentric Africanist? https://sites.google.com/site/intercontinentalbookcentre/godfrey-mwakikagile-a-eurocentric-pan-africanist

Educational institutions with year of establishment missing
Secondary schools in Tanzania
Buildings and structures in the Iringa Region